Enoch Lunn (7 December 1885 – 17 March 1961) was an English professional association footballer of the early twentieth century.

He joined Chesterfield Town in 1905 from a minor team in nearby Clowne and made 24 appearances in The Football League, scoring three goals. In 1906 he joined New Brompton of the Southern League, where he played for one season. He was a regular starter for the Kent-based club in the second half of the 1906–07 season, before signing with Mexborough Athletic in Yorkshire.

References

1885 births
1961 deaths
English Football League players
Gillingham F.C. players
Chesterfield F.C. players
English footballers
Association football forwards